Hongze is one of four districts (a former county) of the prefecture-level city of Huai'an, Jiangsu Province, China. Occupying the southeastern shores of Lake Hongze, it borders the prefecture-level cities of Suqian to the northwest and Yangzhou (briefly) to the east.

During the Second Sino-Japanese War, the New Fourth Army established Huaibao and Hongze countries around Lake Hongze, in 1940 and 1941 respectively. Both countries were dissolved in 1950. The new Hongze country, within a wider area around the lake, was founded to implement the guiding principle of "reshuffling administrative divisions by the lake" in 1956.

Administrative divisions
In the present, Hongze District has 11 towns.
11 towns

Climate

See also
 Lü Peijian

References

www.xzqh.org 

County-level divisions of Jiangsu
Huai'an